Looney Tunes River Ride (formerly known as the Looney Tunes Studio Tour) was a dark boat ride at the amusement park Warner Bros. Movie World at Gold Coast, Australia. The ride was unveiled on 3 June 1991, the same time as the park, and was closed on 1 February 2011 to  make way for the Junior Driving School.

History
Looney Tunes River Ride opened with the Warner Bros. Movie World on 3 June 1991 as Looney Tunes Studio - Journey into Fantasy, and was sponsored by the Nine Network. It was one of four attractions in the Looney Tunes Land section of the park. The ride later had its name changed to Looney Tunes Studio Tour. In 1995, Nine Network's sponsorship of the ride ended, and in December 1997, its name was changed to Looney Tunes River Ride alongside the launch of Looney Tunes Village.

On 30 June 1996, Looney Tunes Adventure opened with Warner Bros. Movie World in Germany as Looney Tunes Studio Tour, and was sponsored by Langnese. The ride was very similar to the version that opened in Australia. Langnese's sponsorship of the ride ended in 1997, and in 1998, the ride's name was changed to Looney Tunes Adventure. On 3 April 2004, Warner Bros. Movie World in Germany was acquired by StarParks. This acquisition resulted in various Warner Bros. licensed properties, including DC Comics and Looney Tunes being removed from the park on 31 October 2004. On 19 March 2005, Movie Park Germany opened with Looney Tunes Adventure being rethemed to Ice Age Adventure.

In early January 2011, as Looney Tunes River Ride had many ongoing technical problems and was out of date, Warner Bros. Movie World announced that the ride would close on 14 February 2011 until further notice in early January, 2011.  Towards the end of the month, the closing date was preponed to 1 February 2011. On 1 February 2011, the ride was permanently closed, and its queue area was converted into a viewing area for the Road Runner Roller Coaster. It was later confirmed on 12 September 2014, that the Looney Tunes River Ride would be replaced with Junior Driving School. On 10 December 2012, the boats, electric steam boilers, slimline tanks and sawed tree used in the Looney Tunes River Ride were put up for auction at Village Roadshow Studios.

Ride experience
The ride began with patrons queuing outside a white show building decorated as a movie studio. They would then be led into a room by a guide where they were welcomed to "Hollywood". The patrons were then informed that they would be taken on a tour of the studio where the latest Looney Tunes movie was being shot. However, Bugs Bunny had dug a hole into the center of the earth down to Australia (Germany in the Warner Bros, Movie World Germany version), resulting in the production to cease. The guests would then walk into another room where the guide would show them a light which indicates the production status. Since production had been stopped, the guests would proceed through a door to the next room. This room was filled with animatronic Looney Tunes characters, three of whom (Porky Pig, Elmer Fudd and Wile E. Coyote) were looking down a hole in the ground. Guests were told that Bugs Bunny had dug a hole through the middle of the earth to Australia/Germany. Riders then were moved into a giant earth drill where they were transported through the Earth to come out at Australia/Germany. Guests would then get on 4 boats, each with 4 rows of 4 seats each before being taken through an animatronics filled ride with a surprising drop towards the end. Then, the patrons went past another scene identical to the one with the animatronics in the pre-show, this time joined by Bugs Bunny, who acted as their guide and was directing the movie. The boats would stop at the unloading station and the guests disembark while Porky Pig delivers his signature line, "Th-th-th-that's all, Folks!".

Voice cast
 Greg Burson as Bugs Bunny, Yosemite Sam, the Tasmanian Devil, Foghorn Leghorn, Pepé Le Pew, and Marc Anthony
 Joe Alaskey as Daffy Duck, Elmer Fudd, Sylvester, and Speedy Gonzales
 Bob Bergen as Porky Pig and Tweety
 Paul Julian as Road Runner (archive recordings)
 Wile E. Coyote appears, but doesn't speak

Ride design
Looney Tunes River Ride was originally designed in-house by Warner Bros. Movie World in Australia. Sanderson Group was also involved in the ride's development, as it designed the ride's entrance, queue areas and theming and the earth drill, and was responsible for the ride's special effects. The park's parent company, Village Roadshow Theme Parks, previously opened Lassiter's Lost Mine at Sea World in 1987, which utilised the same in-house ride system used on the Looney Tunes River Ride. The ride system was designed by Australian Electric Vehicles and controlled by ASI systems from Anitech Systems Inc. The ride had easily spotted sensors that would trigger the animatronics' movements and voices when a boat passed them from below, and its fourteen boats catered for 16 riders distributed in rows of 4. The ride's first pre-show room's walls were themed after the 1981 jigsaw puzzle The Looney Tunes Characters.

Village Roadshow Theme Parks approached many companies about designing animatronics for the ride. Each company was asked to produce a "test/demonstration Bugs", and then Village Roadshow Theme Parks would decide on the company to go with the Bugs Bunny animatronic that they produced. Greg McKee, Matt Ward, John Cox and Chris Chitty designed a demonstration Bugs Bunny animatronic in just a few weeks. This animatronic could sing the Warner Bros. Cartoon Cavalcade version of The Bugs Bunny Shows "This Is It", followed by his catchphrase, "Eh, what's up, doc?" McKee, Ward, Cox and Chitty contacted Keith Scott directly to voice the Bugs animatronic when he says, "Eh, what's up, doc?" He wasn't well known internationally at the time for Looney Tunes voices, and the exposure from doing voices for Warner Bros. Movie World helped him get further voice credit with Warner Bros., and he went on to do narration voiceovers on George of the Jungle, George of the Jungle 2, The Adventures of Rocky and Bullwinkle and others. The animatronic won McKee, Ward, Cox and Chitty the multi-$1,000,000 contract to design the animatronics for Warner Bros. Movie World in 1990, including the 91 audio-animatronics (which used actuators and pneumatics) featured in Looney Tunes River Ride; and was sufficient to strip it away from German animatronic company Heimo and one other company. No one had ever made life-sized three-dimensional versions of the Looney Tunes characters before. Cox had to reconcile all of the poses from the individual character model sheets into a 3D sculpture that looked accurate from every angle. It turned out to be very difficult with quite a few of the characters. Cox used coloured plasticine to replicate the colours of each character. This helped enormously with getting the lines correct, and also made it easy to see the finished character come together in the sculpt. McKee, Ward, Cox and Chitty made plaster waste moulds of the sculptures and then laid 8 millimetres of dark green plasticine into the moulds. A fibreglass part was then made from this which was 8 millimetres smaller as an allowance for the 8 millimetres of fur that was going onto each part. This meant that the finished furred animatronic was the correct size which meant the character likeness remained correct. Cox still has the demonstration Bugs animatronic and most of the other characters (or at least their heads) in his workshop. According to Parkz Forums user aussienetman, Village Roadshow Theme Parks Proprietary Limited then did something sneaky: they decided to use all the demonstration Bugs animatronics (including one designed by Heimo) in the ride, which was why they all looked slightly different from each other.

The German ride, Looney Tunes Adventure, was manufactured by Intamin and Australian Electric Vehicles, and its ride system was controlled by ASI systems from Anitech Systems Inc., and it had easily spotted sensors that would trigger the animatronics' movements and voices in the ride when a boat passed them from below. Looney Tunes Adventure and another Warner Bros. Movie World in Germany attraction, Bermuda Dreieck (now Area 51 - Top Secret), utilised the same in-house ride system. The ride's eleven boats catered for 12 riders distributed in rows of 4, and offered a capacity of 1000 riders per hour. Zeitgeist Design and Production's Ryan Harmon served as the Director of Show Development for Warner Bros. International Recreation Enterprises, where he conceived, wrote and managed the design team for Warner Bros. Movie World in Germany's worth of rides, shows and attractions, including Looney Tunes Adventure. Alan Griffith Architect was also involved in the ride's development. The ride's theming was designed by Botticelli's - Atelier der angewandten Malerei and Sanderson Group. Like Looney Tunes River Ride, Looney Tunes Adventures first pre-show room's walls were themed after The Looney Tunes Characters. The pre-show rooms were painted by Botticelli's - Atelier der angewandten Malerei. Looney Tunes Adventure had more animatronics with moving eye pupils than Looney Tunes River Ride. The ride shared its water, maintenance pools and exit with Die Unendliche Geschichte - Auf der Suche nach Phantasien (now Excalibur - Secrets of the Dark Forest). In 2003, the head of the Speedy Gonzales animatronic in the pre-show was redesigned. The animatronic's open mouth was what made it even creepier than before.

See also
 Bermuda Triangle, another now defunct Village Roadshow water ride which utilised the same ride system
 2011 in amusement parks

References

External links
 Looney Tunes River Ride at the Parkz Database

Animatronic attractions
Dark rides
Sally Corporation animatronics